The 2002 Georgia Southern Eagles football team represented the Georgia Southern University as a member of the Southern Conference (SoCon) during the 2002 NCAA Division I-AA football season. Led by first-year head coach Mike Sewak, the Eagles compiled an overall record of 11–3 with a mark of 7–1 in conference play, winning the SoCon title for the sixth consecutive season. Georgia Southern advanced to the NCAA Division I-AA Football Championship playoffs, where they defeated Bethune–Cookman in the first round and Maine in the quarterfinals before falling to Western Kentucky in the semifinals. Eagles played their home games at Paulson Stadium in Statesboro, Georgia.

Schedule

References

Georgia Southern
Georgia Southern Eagles football seasons
Southern Conference football champion seasons
Georgia Southern Eagles football